Charles Edward Simpson (27 March 1882 – 26 June 1956) was an Australian cricketer. He played first-class cricket for Queensland and New South Wales between 1906 and 1910.

Charles Simpson showed promise in the five matches he played for Queensland in three seasons, and was selected in three matches for The Rest (of Australia): two against the Australian Test team and one against New South Wales. In the one against New South Wales in January 1910 he opened the batting and scored 102 in the second innings in 102 minutes, putting on 167 for the first wicket with Edgar Mayne. He was selected a few days later in the Australian team that toured New Zealand at the end of the season, and played in five first-class matches on the tour, including one of the two against New Zealand.

See also
 List of New South Wales representative cricketers

References

External links
 

1882 births
1956 deaths
Australian cricketers
New South Wales cricketers
Queensland cricketers
Cricketers from Sydney